Chakkaramuthu is a 2006 Malayalam film directed by Lohithadas and starring Dileep , Sai Kumar, 
Jishnu and Kavya Madhavan in the lead roles . Under the banner of Seven Arts International, G.P. Produced by Vijayakumar, the film was distributed by Seven Arts Release . Story, screenplay and dialogues by A. K. Lohithadas . Dileep plays the role of a person with an intellectual disability.

Synopsis
Aravindakshan is a sought-after tailor, specialising in blouses, working in a shop owned by Kumaran. Despite his evident mental difficulty, Aravindakshan is shown as worldly-wise, with his own way of dealing with things.

He loves Anitha deeply in his heart while she feels pity of him. In fact, he is known as her Black Cat security. One day, he tries to kiss her when his friend Santosh instigates him. She is shocked but later uses the incident to cover up her love with Jeevan from her strict mother, who wants her to marry doctor Rajiv.

Anita's uncle a police officer and mom fix her marriage on learning about her affair. She however elopes with Jeevan and goes to Bangalore with the help of Aravindakshan but soon realizes that Jeevan is a cheat. The rest of the film is on what happens to Anitha and Aravindakshan's deep love for her.

Cast

References

External links
 

2000s Malayalam-language films
Films scored by M. Jayachandran
2006 romantic comedy films
2006 films
Films with screenplays by A. K. Lohithadas
Indian romantic comedy films
Films shot in Palakkad
Films directed by A. K. Lohithadas